Heinrich Vogel (April 9, 1902 – December 26, 1989) was an evangelical theologian, poet of sacred texts and songs and composer of numerous motets and chamber music.
He studied theology at the University of Berlin and the University of Jena. In 1927 he became a minister for the Evangelical Church of the old-Prussian Union in Oderberg.

Soon after the Nazi takeover in Germany Vogel joined the Confessing Church, the movement of Protestants opposing the adulteration of the Protestant creeds by the Nazi-submissive so-called German Christians, with Vogel building up independent church administrations paralleling those within Protestant regional denominations  under German-Christians' dominance (so-called ) and was elected a member of the German-wide Protestant Synod of Confession and the old-Prussian Union Synod of Confession. Uncompromisingly he fought the German Christians and committed himself to the opposition against the Nazi state. In 1935 he became lecturer at the outlawed underground Ecclesiastical College (Kirchliche Hochschule) in Berlin and served as its director between 1937 and 1941. In those years he was several times arrested and inflicted the prohibition to write and publish in 1941.

He was a professor of systematic theology at Humboldt University in East Berlin in 1948 and co-founder of the Christian Peace Conference (CFK). His theological method was Christocentric word theology (christozentrische Worttheologie). Vogel was married since 1928 with his wife Irmgard (died 1980), with whom he had seven children.

References

20th-century German theologians
1902 births
1989 deaths
Humboldt University of Berlin alumni
Academic staff of the Humboldt University of Berlin
University of Jena alumni
20th-century German poets
20th-century German composers
German male poets
German male composers
20th-century German male writers
Commanders Crosses of the Order of Merit of the Federal Republic of Germany
20th-century German male musicians